MusicBrainz is a MetaBrainz project that aims to create a collaborative music database that is similar to the freedb project. MusicBrainz was founded in response to the restrictions placed on the Compact Disc Database (CDDB), a database for software applications to look up audio CD information on the Internet. MusicBrainz has expanded its goals to reach beyond a CD metadata (this is information about the performers, artists, songwriters, etc.) storehouse to become a structured online database for music.

MusicBrainz captures information about artists, their recorded works, and the relationships between them. Recorded works entries capture at a minimum the album title, track titles, and the length of each track. These entries are maintained by volunteer editors who follow community written style guidelines. Recorded works can also store information about the release date and country, the CD ID, cover art, acoustic fingerprint, free-form annotation text and other metadata. , MusicBrainz contains information on roughly 2.1 million artists, 3.5 million releases, and 28.8 million recordings. End-users can use software that communicates with MusicBrainz to add metadata tags to their digital media files, such as ALAC, FLAC, MP3, Ogg Vorbis or AAC.

Cover Art Archive

MusicBrainz allows contributors to upload cover art images of releases to the database; these images are hosted by Cover Art Archive (CAA), a joint project between Internet Archive and MusicBrainz started in 2012. Internet Archive provides the bandwidth, storage and legal protection for hosting the images, while MusicBrainz stores metadata and provides public access through the web and via an API for third parties to use. As with other contributions, the MusicBrainz community is in charge of maintaining and reviewing the data. Until May 16, 2022, cover art was also provided for items on sale at Amazon.com and some other online resources, but CAA is now preferred because it gives the community more control and flexibility for managing the images. , over 3.7 million images exist in the archive.

Fingerprinting
Besides collecting metadata about music, MusicBrainz also allows looking up recordings by their acoustic fingerprint. A separate application, such as MusicBrainz Picard, must be used for this.

Proprietary services
In 2000, MusicBrainz started using Relatable's patented TRM (a recursive acronym for TRM Recognizes Music) for acoustic fingerprint matching. This feature attracted many users and allowed the database to grow quickly. However, by 2005 TRM was showing scalability issues as the number of tracks in the database had reached into the millions. This issue was resolved in May 2006 when MusicBrainz partnered with MusicIP (now AmpliFIND), replacing TRM with MusicDNS. TRMs were phased out and replaced by MusicDNS in November 2008.

In October 2009 MusicIP was acquired by AmpliFIND. Some time after the acquisition, the MusicDNS service began having intermittent problems.

AcoustID and Chromaprint
Since the future of the free identification service was uncertain, a replacement for it was sought. The Chromaprint acoustic fingerprinting algorithm, the basis for AcoustID identification service, was started in February 2010 by a long-time MusicBrainz contributor Lukáš Lalinský. While AcoustID and Chromaprint are not officially MusicBrainz projects, they are closely tied with each other and both are open source. Chromaprint works by analyzing the first two minutes of a track, detecting the strength in each of 12 pitch classes, storing these eight times per second. Additional post-processing is then applied to compress this fingerprint while retaining patterns. The AcoustID search server then searches from the database of fingerprints by similarity and returns the AcoustID identifier along with MusicBrainz recording identifiers, if known.

Licensing
Since 2003, MusicBrainz's core data (artists, recordings, releases, and so on) are in the public domain, and additional content, including moderation data (essentially every original content contributed by users and its elaborations), is placed under the Creative Commons CC-BY-NC-SA-2.0 license. The relational database management system is PostgreSQL. The server software is covered by the GNU General Public License.
The MusicBrainz client software library, libmusicbrainz, is licensed under the GNU Lesser General Public License, which allows use of the code by proprietary software products.

In December 2004, the MusicBrainz project was turned over to the MetaBrainz Foundation, a non-profit group, by its creator Robert Kaye. On 20 January 2006, the first commercial venture to use MusicBrainz data was the Barcelona, Spain-based Linkara in their "Linkara Música" service.

On 28 June 2007, BBC announced that it had licensed MusicBrainz's live data feed to augment their music web pages. The BBC online music editors would also join the MusicBrainz community to contribute their knowledge to the database.

On 28 July 2008, the beta of the new BBC Music site was launched, which publishes a page for each MusicBrainz artist.

Client software 
 Amarok – KDE audio player
 Banshee – multi-platform audio player
 Beets – automatic CLI music tagger/organiser for Unix-like systems
 Clementine – multi-platform audio player
 CDex – Microsoft Windows CD ripper
 Demlo – a dynamic and extensible music manager using a CLI
 Exact Audio Copy – Microsoft Windows CD ripper
 iEatBrainz – MacOSX, deprecated
 foo_musicbrainz component for foobar2000 – music library/audio Player
 Jaikoz – Java mass tag editor
 Max – Mac OS X CD ripper and audio transcoder
 Mp3tag – Windows metadata editor and music organizer
 MusicBrainz Picard – cross-platform album-oriented tag editor
 MusicBrainz Tagger – deprecated Microsoft Windows tag editor
 puddletag – a tag editor for PyQt under the GPLv3
 Rhythmbox music player – an audio player for Unix-like systems
 Sound Juicer – GNOME CD ripper
 Zortam Mp3 Media Studio – Windows music organizer and ID3 tag editor

Freedb clients could also access MusicBrainz data through the freedb protocol by using the MusicBrainz to FreeDB gateway service, mb2freedb. The gateway was shut down on March 18, 2019.

See also
 List of online music databases

References

Further reading
 Making Metadata: The Case of MusicBrainz. Jess Hemerly. Master's project at UC Berkeley. 2011.

External links

 
  – official site
 MusicBrainz info at the BBC Music site

 
Acoustic fingerprinting
Free-content websites
Library 2.0
Library cataloging and classification
Metadata registry
Multilingual websites
Online music and lyrics databases
Tag editors that use Qt
American online encyclopedias